Holy Trinity Church, Lickey is a Church of England parish church in Lickey, Worcestershire.

History
The foundation stone was laid on 16 May 1855 by Robert Windsor-Clive (MP). It was built as a chapel of ease to St John the Baptist Church, Bromsgrove. The architect was Henry Day of Worcester and the contractor was John Robinson of Redditch.

The church was consecrated on 6 June 1856 by the Bishop of Worcester.

The church was enlarged between 1893 and 1894 by Alfred Reading of Birmingham when the chancel arch was widened for a new organ chamber and vestry. The vestry was built in 1898 and enlarged in 1970.

The church started a mission in Rubery. In 1933 part of the parish was taken to form the new parish of St Chad's Church, Rubery.

Organ
An organ was built by Jon Nicholson and installed in 1856. A specification of the organ can be found on the National Pipe Organ Register.

Churchyard
Herbert Austin, 1st Baron Austin, the automobile designer and builder who founded the Austin Motor Company, lived at nearby Lickey Grange and is buried in the churchyard.

References

Church of England church buildings in Worcestershire
Churches completed in 1856